Timothy Lloyd Brooks (born July 17, 1964) is a  United States district judge of the United States District Court for the Western District of Arkansas.

Biography

Brooks was born on July 17, 1964, in Detroit, Michigan, but was raised on a farm in Washington County, Arkansas. He graduated from Fayetteville High School in 1982. He received his Bachelor of Science in Business Administration in 1986 from the University of Arkansas. He received his Juris Doctor in 1989 from the University of Arkansas School of Law. He spent his entire private practice career at the Fayetteville, Arkansas law firm Taylor Law Partners, LLP., starting as an associate in 1989, becoming a partner in 1993. His former practice focused on representing individual plaintiffs and corporate clients in complex civil litigation in both federal and state courts, with an emphasis on commercial and medical malpractice cases.

Federal judicial service

On June 7, 2013, President Barack Obama nominated Brooks to serve as a United States District Judge of the United States District Court for the Western District of Arkansas, to the seat vacated by Judge Jimm Larry Hendren, who assumed senior status on December 31, 2012. His nomination was reported to the full U.S. Senate on January 16, 2014. The motion to invoke cloture was agreed to on March 5, 2014, by a 59–41 vote. His nomination was later confirmed by the full Senate by a 100–0 vote. He received his judicial commission on March 7, 2014.

References

External links

1964 births
Living people
Arkansas lawyers
Judges of the United States District Court for the Western District of Arkansas
Lawyers from Detroit
United States district court judges appointed by Barack Obama
21st-century American judges
University of Arkansas School of Law alumni